The women's 4 × 200 metre freestyle relay event at the 2014 Commonwealth Games as part of the swimming programme took place on 26 July at the Tollcross International Swimming Centre in Glasgow, Scotland.

The medals were presented by Kamalesh Sharma, Secretary-General of the Commonwealth of Nations and the quaichs were presented by Tim Griffin, Vice-President and General Manager of Dell UK.

Records
Prior to this competition, the existing world and Commonwealth Games records were as follows.

The following records were established during the competition:

Results

Heats

Final

References

External links

Women's 4 x 200 metre freestyle relay
Commonwealth Games
2014 in women's swimming